An identity verification service is used by businesses to ensure that users or customers provide information that is associated with the identity of a real person. The service may verify the authenticity of physical identity documents such as a drivers license, passport, or a nationally issued identity document through documentary verification. Additionally, also involve the verification of identity information (fields) against independent and authoritative sources, such as a credit bureau or proprietary government data.

Background 
Identity verification services were developed to help companies comply with Anti-Money Laundering (AML) and Know Your Customer (KYC) rules, identity verification is now a vital component to the transaction ecosystems of eCommerce companies, financial institutions, online gaming, and even social media. Through adopting digital fraud prevention methods, businesses can achieve AML and KYC compliance while addressing the risks associated with fraud.

In financial industries, verifying identity is often required by regulations known as Know Your Customer or Customer Identification Program. In the US, one of the many bodies regulating these procedures is the Financial Crimes Enforcement Network (FinCEN). The Financial Actions Task Force (FATF) is a global anti-money laundering and terrorist financing watchdog organization.

A non-documentary identity verification requires the user or customer to provide personal identity data which is sent to the identity verification service. The service checks public and proprietary private databases for a match on the information provided. Optionally, knowledge-based authentication questions can be presented to the person providing the information to ensure that he or she is the owner of the identity. An identity "score" is calculated, and the identity of the user or customer is either given the "verified" status or not, based on the score.

Customers of various businesses, such as retail merchants, government entities, or financial institutions, are often required to present an identification to complete a transaction. For instance, a merchant may require customer identification for various types of purchases (e.g., alcohol, lottery, or tobacco purchases) or when certain types of payments (e.g., checks, credit cards) are presented to pay for transactions. Financial institutions usually require customers to present a form of identification to complete a withdrawal or deposit transaction, cash a check, or open a new account. Government entities may require identification for access into secure areas or other purposes. Other businesses may also require identification from customers.

An additional method to service Identity Verification that is gaining industry prominence is artificial intelligence, more commonly referred to as artificial intelligence–based identity verification. ID verification is performed through a webcam, and the results are available in real time and are more accurate than the untrained eye. However, there have been concerns about Eurocentric bias in artificial intelligence and how that could affect the accuracy of results.

Application 
Industries that use identity verification services include financial services, digital businesses, travel and leisure, sharing economy businesses, telecom, FinTech, gaming and entertainment.

Identity verification services exist both online and in-person to verify identities. These services are used in the financial service industry, e-commerce platforms, social networking sites, Internet forums, dating sites, and wikis to curb sockpuppetry, underage signups, spamming and illegal activities like harassment, Identity fraud, and money laundering. For example, in banking, identity verification may be required in order to open a bank account.

There is an increasing call for regulation with the rise in popularity of cryptocurrency exchanges. In December 2020 the U.S. government's Financial Crimes Enforcement Network (FinCEN) has proposed rules to require banks and money service businesses (“MSBs”) such as cryptocurrency wallets to submit reports, keep records, and verify the identity of users who perform transactions with convertible virtual currency.

See also
 Identity management
 Identity management system

References

Identity management systems
Internet privacy